Jianshan Temple, is a buddhist temple located in Yangshuo County, Guilin, Guangxi Zhuang Autonomous Region, in the People's Republic of China. It includes the shanmen, Mahavira Hall, Meditation Room, Dining Room, etc.

History

In 713, in the first year of the age of Kaiyuan (713–742) of Emperor Xuanzong, the temple was built. In summer 748, Jianzhen made his fifth attempt to reach Japan, but he failed, he lived in Jianshan Temple.

In 1995, the government planned to rebuild the temple. On January 1, 2001, the temple was rebuilt and opened to the public.

References

External links

Buildings and structures in Guilin
Buddhist temples in Guangxi
Tourist attractions in Guilin
8th-century establishments in China
8th-century Buddhist temples
Religious buildings and structures completed in 713